Following the dethronements (please read below for further info) of Anyella Grados and Tiffany Yoko Chong; the president of the Miss Peru Organization, Jessica Newton took the decision to organize a special edition of the Miss Peru 2019 pageant. The new format consisted of ten former contestants that had previous pageant experience whether at international or national level to compete for the national crown and to represent the country in other selected pageants.

This edition was held on the night of October 20, 2019, at the Maracaná Event Center in Jesús María, Lima, Peru after weeks of events. The theme of the contest consisted of a platform opposing violence against women, which is an ongoing social threat that keeps harming the Peruvian society, as well as the rest of Latin America.

Due to commitments with a different broadcaster, outgoing titleholder Romina Lozano was not there to crown her successor.

As head of the organization and on behalf of the judges panel that included her, Newton crowned Kelin Rivera of Arequipa as the new Miss Peru at the end of the event.

Placements

Special awards

 Miss Empowerment - Pasco - Jessamin Chaparro
 Miss Teoma - Region Lima - Lesly Reyna

Delegates

Judges
 Jessica Newton - President of the Miss Peru Organization
 Karen Schwarz – Miss Peru 2009
 Mónica Chacón D’Vettori - Miss World Peru 1996
 Alexander Gonzalez - Beauty Pageant Coach
 Adriana Zubiate – Miss Perú 2002
 Ángela Ponce - Miss Spain 2018
 Laura Spoya – Miss Peru 2015
 Fabian Navt - Preliminary Judge
 Viviana Rivasplata - Miss Perú 2001
 Maria Jose Lora - Miss Grand International 2017

Music & Special Guests Singers
Opening Show – "El Cóndor Pasa" (Instrumental)
Interviews – Fort Minor (feat. Styles of Beyond) - Remember the Name
Swimsuit Competition – Banda de la Guardia Republicana - "La Concheperla"
Activities – Marian Hill - "Down"
Evening Gown Competition – Manuel José - "Gavilán o Paloma" & "Lo Pasado, Pasado"

Miss World Peru 2019

The Miss World Peru 2019 pageant was held on August 18, 2019, following weeks of preparation.

The outgoing titleholder, Clarisse Uribe of Ica crowned her successor, Angella Escudero of Piura at the end of the event.

MWP 2019 Placements

MWP 2019 special awards
 Miss Congeniality - Mollendo - Camila Camino
 Miss Elegance - La Libertad - Leticia Hurtado 
 Most Beautiful Face - Piura - Angella Escudero
 Miss Body- Arequipa - Lisdey Paredes

MWP 2019 delegates

MWP 2019 background music
Opening Show – Christina Aguilera - Candyman
Swimsuit Competition – Lou Bega - Mambo No. 5
Evening Gown Competition – Piano Medley - (Por El Amor De Una Mujer & Toda una Vida)

Initial MP 2019 Pageant | Controversies, Scandal and Dethronements

What was supposed to be the original Miss Peru 2019 pageant was held on the night of October 21, 2018. This contest was held in the historic centre's Municipal Theatre in Lima, Peru after weeks of events.

The outgoing titleholder, Romina Lozano of Callao crowned Anyella Grados of La Libertad at the end of the event.

The pageant was broadcast by Latina Television and again hosted by presenter Cristian Rivero with the outside commenting of Miss Peru 2009, Karen Schwarz.

This election became a platform searching breast cancer prevention for women in Peru: when the 50 candidates took the floor to specify their measurements, each one announced an statistics and advice at the same time they exposure their shave heads in manner to respect of patients suffering of the illness.

The final results of this first pageant were heavily criticized by Peruvians, media, and pageant fans as this edition of the event featured to be very questionable. Grados was never categorized as a favorite to win the title and she did not excel throughout the crowning night in any of the cuts (Swimsuit, Evening Gown, and Final Answer) where she was overshadowed by many other contestants. In fact, she delivered an erroneous answer about the country's current political situation in the topic of corruption. Escribens, the 1st Runner-Up, has been also in the eye of the storm as she does not speak Spanish fluently and still has obvious trouble with the country's national language, which questioned her progress during the final answers portion. It was unknown whether other finalists will want to represent Peru at the international level with the many discrepancies seen within the organization.

Months following this debacle, in March 2019, Grados and 2nd Runner-Up, Tiffany Yoko Chong were dethroned and stripped of their titles due to inappropriate behavior following a trip sponsored by the organization. These events were heavily criticized by the media and Peruvian citizens, among international community among pageantry experts and fans in regards to unacceptable incidents involving two representatives of the country. Despite 1st Runner-Up Escribens' attendance to this trip as well, she was not involved in the incidents and was forgiven to keep her title of Miss Grand Peru but not to inherit the national crown as rules stipulated. A new contest was to be announced to erase the happenings that tarnished these first event which already had not popular results.

Initial MP placements

Initial MP 2019 delegates

Initial MP 2019 music & special guest singers
Opening – Jonathan Moly - "Te Besare"
Parade of Regions – Alexandra Burke - "Hallelujah"
Swimsuit Competition – Tony Succar & Jean Rodriguez - "Michael Jackson Medley" (Uptown Funk/ Billie Jean/ Black Or White)
Evening Gown Competition – Chyno Miranda - "El Peor"

References

Miss Peru
Peru